My Friend Tony is an American crime drama that aired on NBC in 1969. The pilot originally aired as "My Pal Tony" on The Danny Thomas Hour on March 4, 1968.

Synopsis
The series features Enzo Cerusico as the title character, Tony Novello, and James Whitmore as John Woodruff, a professor of criminology who served in Italy during World War II. As a child, Novello had been a street urchin who survived as a pickpocket, with Woodruff being one of his intended victims. The premise of the series was that the adult (and reformed) Novello had emigrated to the United States to join Woodruff in a private investigation team. Novello handled the legwork and physical side of the investigations while Woodruff conducted painstaking analysis of the most obscure clues.

My Friend Tony debuted on January 5, 1969. NBC slotted the program in the 10 p.m. Eastern timeslot on Sundays, following Bonanza. The network ended production of the series after 16 episodes but continued airing reruns of the show through that summer. The program aired for the last time on August 31, 1969.

Reception
Despite having the highly successful Bonanza as its lead-in, Sheldon Leonard — who developed My Friend Tony and was its executive producer — attributed the program's low ratings to its timeslot.

"First, the 10-to-11 P.M. time spot didn't take full advantage of Enzo's youthful audience, as shown by his flood of fan mail, which exceeds anything in our experience," Leonard told TV Guide. "Second, because of the one-hour length and the network's commitment to 27 new projects all demanding air time, there was no 8 or 9 o'clock spot into which to move it."

Critics had savaged My Friend Tony, calling the series "hackneyed and confusing" ... "the kind of minimal fare that has been ground out ad nauseam" ... "mundane" and "bilge."

Episodes

References

External links
 

1969 American television series debuts
1969 American television series endings
1960s American crime drama television series
English-language television shows
NBC original programming
Television series by CBS Studios